Thierry Tassin (born 11 January 1959) is a Belgian racing driver. He won the prestigious Spa 24 Hours endurance race on four occasions (1983, '86, '94 and '96) - all in a BMW

Racing record

Complete European Formula Two Championship results
(key) (Races in bold indicate pole position; races in italics indicate fastest lap)

Complete International Formula 3000 results
(key) (Races in bold indicate pole position; races in italics indicate fastest lap.)

Complete British Saloon Car Championship results
(key) (Races in bold indicate pole position; races in italics indicate fastest lap.)

† Events with 2 races staged for the different classes.

‡ Car not to full BSCC specification - Not eligible for points.

Complete World Touring Car Championship results
(key) (Races in bold indicate pole position) (Races in italics indicate fastest lap)

NASCAR
(key) (Bold – Pole position awarded by qualifying time. Italics – Pole position earned by points standings or practice time. * – Most laps led.)

Busch Series

References

1959 births
Living people
Belgian racing drivers
European Formula Two Championship drivers
International Formula 3000 drivers
24 Hours of Spa drivers
European Touring Car Championship drivers

BMW M drivers
Racing Bart Mampaey drivers
Alan Docking Racing drivers
Schnitzer Motorsport drivers
20th-century Belgian people